Marco Mallus (born 24 January 1982) is an Italian footballer who plays as a defender for Italian club AS Ciabbino.

Career
Mallus started his career at hometown club Como. After a loan spell with Legnano of Serie C2, he joined South Tyrol of the same division in co-ownership deal in June 2001, for 1 million lire (€516). That season South Tyrol also signed Carlo Gervasoni and sold Luigi Crisopulli back to Como. In June 2004 Como gave up the remain 50% registration rights of Mallus for free and bought back Gervasoni for €120,000.

In 2005 Treviso signed him in another co-ownership deal. Although he just played twice at Serie A, Treviso bought all remain registration rights. After just played 13 league matches in 2 seasons, he left for Reggiana in another co-ownership deal, for a peppercorn of €500. He played 21 league matches in the first season and Reggiana choose to bought the remain rights. In the second season he just played 8 league matches before left for Viareggio of 2008–09 Lega Pro Seconda Divisione.

Since 2011 Mallus played for Serie D clubs, such as Gozzano, Civitanovese and most recently Ancona.

References

External links
AIC profile (data by football.it) 
La Gazzetta profile (2007–08 season) 

Italian footballers
Como 1907 players
A.C. Legnano players
F.C. Südtirol players
Treviso F.B.C. 1993 players
A.C. Reggiana 1919 players
F.C. Esperia Viareggio players
A.C. Mezzocorona players
Serie A players
Serie B players
Sportspeople from Como
Association football central defenders
1982 births
Living people
Footballers from Lombardy